Dagbjört Dögg Karlsdóttir is an Icelandic basketball player for Valur of the Úrvalsdeild kvenna and a member of the Icelandic national team. She won the Icelandic championship in 2019 and 2021 and the Icelandic Cup in 2019. In 2021, she was named the Úrvalsdeild Defensive Player of the Year and in 2022, she was named to the Úrvalsdeild Domestic All-First Team. In 2018, she was named the Úrvalsdeild Young Player of the Year.

Early life
Dagbjört grew up in Reykir in Hrútafjörður where she started playing basketball with Kormákur from Hvammstangi.

National team career
After playing for Iceland's junior teams, Dagbjört debuted for the Icelandic senior national team in 2017.

References

1999 births
Living people
Dagbjört Dögg Karlsdóttir
Dagbjört Dögg Karlsdóttir
Point guards
Dagbjört Dögg Karlsdóttir
Dagbjört Dögg Karlsdóttir